Hubert Brad Lewis (December 25, 1930 – December 29, 2020), known professionally as Hugh X. Lewis, was an American country music singer. Born in Yeaddiss, Kentucky, he recorded for various labels since 1964, and charted fifteen singles on the Hot Country Songs charts. Lewis's debut single, "What I Need Most", peaked at number 21 on this chart. Lewis also wrote eleven songs for Stonewall Jackson including the number one single "B.J. the D.J."

Biography
Hubert Brad Lewis was born in Yeaddiss, Kentucky. He worked at a steel mill in Kentucky and moved to Nashville, Tennessee, in 1963 and first had success as a songwriter, writing "B.J. the D.J." for Stonewall Jackson; Mac Wiseman and George Morgan also covered Lewis's songs.

In 1964, Lewis released his first single for Kapp Records, "What I Need Most". The song peaked at number 21 on the U.S. country singles charts. Lewis released ten more singles for Kapp, including the top 40 hits "Out Where the Ocean Meets the Sky", "I'd Better Call the Law on Me", "You're So Cold (I'm Turning Blue)" and "Evolution and the Bible". He also had a Top 20 hit in Canada with "All Heaven Broke Loose".

Lewis opened a club in Printer's Alley in 1972, where he hosted a television show also titled Hugh X. Lewis Country Club  It was sponsored by Heil Quaker Corporation and appeared in 91 major markets.

Lewis died from complications of COVID-19 in Nashville, Tennessee, on December 29, 2020, at the age of 90.

Discography

Albums

Singles

References

1932 births
2020 deaths
American country singers
American country songwriters
People from Leslie County, Kentucky
Country musicians from Kentucky
Deaths from the COVID-19 pandemic in Tennessee